Fusi Mountain is located in the southwestern part of Ningxiang County in central Hunan Province. It is a part of Xuefeng Mountains.

The highest point of the mountain, the Jinfeng Temple, measures  in height. It is located in the center part of the mountain.

Cultural sites
Jinfeng Temple is a Buddhist temple that was built in the Tang Dynasty to worship Guanyin and the Jade Emperor.

References

Geography of Ningxiang
Tourist attractions in Changsha
Mountains of Hunan